The women's sanda (as Sanshou) 52 kg competition at the 2010 Asian Games in Guangzhou, China was held from 13 November to 17 November at the Nansha Gymnasium.

A total of twelve competitors from twelve countries competed in this event, limited to fighters whose body weight was less than 52 kilograms.

E Meidie from China won the gold medal after beating Nguyễn Thị Bích of Vietnam in gold medal bout 2–0. The bronze medal was shared by Elaheh Mansourian from Iran and Lee Jung-hee from South Korea.

Athletes from the Philippines (Mary Jane Estimar), Nepal (Elina Chaudhary), Bangladesh (Eti Islam) and India (Yumnam Sanathoi Devi) shared the fifth place.

Schedule
All times are China Standard Time (UTC+08:00)

Results
Legend
AV — Absolute victory
KO — Won by knockout

References

External links
Official website

Women's sanda 52 kg